The 2008 Pittsburgh Pirates season was the 127th season of the franchise; the 122nd in the National League. This was their eighth season at PNC Park. It was the first under new president Frank Coonelly, general manager Neal Huntington, and manager John Russell. Unable to improve on their 68–94, last place finish during the 2007 season, the Pirates had not had a winning record or made it to the playoffs since 1992, and finished 67–95 for their 16th straight losing season. The season was the final of play-by-play announcer Lanny Frattare, whose 33-year tenure as Pirates' broadcaster was the longest in franchise history.

Regular season

On November 5, 2007, John Russell was introduced as the Pirates manager, replacing Jim Tracy. Team management cited three areas that the franchise hoped to improve: "refocused emphasis on fundamentals", holding players to a higher standard, and signing younger players. The Pirates won their season opener against the Atlanta Braves, by the score of 12–11, in 12 innings. The Pirates played their home opener against the division-rival Chicago Cubs on April 7, losing 10–8, also in 12 innings. The Pirates started out the season with a 7–7 record after the first half-month; however, after a five-game losing streak they began to struggle, finishing out April with an 11–16 record. The Pirates losing continued as they dropped three of four to the Washington Nationals to begin May. The team fought back, winning six straight games—the most consecutive since 2004, to bring their record within one victory of a .500 record. Throughout the remainder of May the team struggled, but never fell more than four games under .500. Throughout the early months of the season closer Matt Capps was perfect, getting saves in 15 consecutive opportunities. However, on June 10, Capps gave up a two-run home run to the Nationals, losing his first decision of the season. In addition, Capps would blow saves in two of his next three appearances; however, he achieved his first win of the season after an extra-inning victory over the Baltimore Orioles.

Pittsburgh went 6–9 in interleague play, including two wins against the New York Yankees who returned to Pittsburgh for the first time since the 1960 World Series. On July 12, in a game against the St. Louis Cardinals, the Pirates came back to win a game that they trailed by six runs in the seventh inning. It was only the second time in the past 25 years that the Pirates won at home after scoring runs in the seventh, eighth, ninth, and extra innings. The Pirates finished out the remainder of July with a 6–9 record—50–58 overall. On the final day of July, the Pirates made a deal with the Yankees to send outfielder Xavier Nady and pitcher Dámaso Marte in return for Jeff Karstens, Daniel McCutchen, Ross Ohlendorf and José Tábata. Later in the day the team became involved in a three-team deal in which the Pirates sent Jason Bay to the Boston Red Sox in return for four players from the Los Angeles Dodgers. The Pirates won seven of the first 18 games in August before dropping ten consecutive games to close out the month. Pittsburgh entered the final month of the season 21 games below the .500 mark. On September 7, the Pirates lost their 82nd game of the season, tying them with the Philadelphia Phillies as the only two franchises in professional sports history to have losing records in 16 consecutive seasons. The Pirates concluded their season on September 28 with a victory against the San Diego Padres. The team became the second in the Pirates' 122-year history to have no pitchers to win 10 games. The performance of the pitchers lead the team to fire pitching coach Jeff Andrews after the season.

Standings

Game log

|- style="background:#cfc;" 
| 1 || March 31 || @ Braves || 12–11 (12) || Osoria (1–0) || Boyer (0–1) || — || 45,269 || 1–0
|-

|- style="background:#fcc;"
| 2 || April 2 || @ Braves || 2–10 || Jurrjens (1–0) || Gorzelanny (0–1) || — || 17,893 || 1–1
|- style="background:#cfc;" 
| 3 || April 3 || @ Braves || 4–3 (10) || Yates (1–0) || Resop (0–1) || Capps (1) || 19,240 || 2–1
|- style="background:#fcc;"
| 4 || April 4 || @ Marlins || 4–5 || Gregg (1–0) || Osoria (1–1) || — || 10,089 || 2–2
|- style="background:#fcc;"
| 5 || April 5 || @ Marlins || 3–7 || Hendrickson (1–1) || Maholm (0–1) || — || 15,752 || 2–3
|- style="background:#cfc;" 
| 6 || April 6 || @ Marlins || 9–2 || Snell (1–0) || VandenHurk (0–1) || — || 10,431 || 3–3
|- style="background:#fcc;"
| 7 || April 7 || Cubs || 8–10 (12) || Lieber (1–1) || Meek (0–1) || Mármol (1) || 37,491 || 3–4
|- style="background:#fcc;"
| 8 || April 9 || Cubs || 4–6 (15) || Hart (2–0) || Dumatrait (0–1) || Marshall (1) || 9,735 || 3–5
|- style="background:#fcc;"
| 9 || April 10 || Cubs || 3–7 || Lieber (2–1) || Morris (0–1) || — || 9,798 || 3–6
|- style="background:#cfc;" 
| 10 || April 11 || Reds || 1–0 || Grabow (1–0) || Burton (0–1) || Capps (2) || 13,603 || 4–6
|- style="background:#cfc;" 
| 11 || April 12 || Reds || 4–3 || Snell (2–0) || Lincoln (0–1) || Capps (3) || 18,096 || 5–6
|- style="background:#cfc;" 
| 12 || April 13 || Reds || 9–1 || Gorzelanny (1–1) || Cueto (1–1) || — || 11,201 || 6–6
|- style="background:#cfc;" 
| 13 || April 14 || @ Dodgers || 6–4 || Yates (2–0) || Saito (1–1) || Capps (4) || 37,334 || 7–6
|- style="background:#fcc;"
| 14 || April 15 || @ Dodgers || 2–11 || Loaiza (1–2) || Morris (0–2) || — || 37,896 || 7–7
|- style="background:#fcc;"
| 15 || April 16 || @ Dodgers || 1–8 || Penny (2–2) || Maholm (0–2) || — || 53,629 || 7–8
|- style="background:#fcc;"
| 16 || April 18 || @ Cubs || 2–3 || Hill (1–0) || Snell (2–1) || Wood (4) || 39,118 || 7–9
|- style="background:#fcc;"
| 17 || April 19 || @ Cubs || 1–13 || Marquis (1–0) || Gorzelanny (1–2) || — || 40,298 || 7–10
|- style="background:#fcc;"
| 18 || April 20 || @ Cubs || 6–13 || Dempster (3–0) || Duke (0–1) || — || 41,405 || 7–11
|- style="background:#fcc;"
| 19 || April 21 || Marlins || 4–10 || Hendrickson (4–1) || Morris (0–3) || — || 8,444 || 7–12
|- style="background:#cfc;" 
| 20 || April 22 || Marlins || 3–2 || Maholm (1–2) || Nolasco (1–2) || Capps (5) || 10,185 || 8–12
|- style="background:#cfc;" 
| 21 || April 23 || Cardinals || 7–4 || Marte (1–0) || Reyes (1–1) || Capps (6) || 10,487 || 9–12
|- style="background:#fcc;"
| 22 || April 24 || Cardinals || 2–6 || Piñeiro (1–2) || Gorzelanny (1–3) || Isringhausen (7) || 9,544 || 9–13
|- style="background:#fcc;"
| 23 || April 25 || Phillies || 5–6 || Gordon (2–2) || Duke (0–2) || Lidge (6) || 23,930 || 9–14
|- style="background:#fcc;"
| 24 || April 26 || Phillies || 4–8 || Kendrick (2–2) || Morris (0–4) || — || 24,791 || 9–15
|- style="background:#cfc;" 
| 25 || April 27 || Phillies || 5–1 || Maholm (2–2) || Myers (2–2) || — || 17,588 || 10–15
|- style="background:#bbb;"
| — || April 28 || @ Mets || colspan=6| Postponed rain (Rescheduled for August 11)
|- style="background:#fcc;"
| 26 || April 29 || @ Mets || 4–5 (11) || Sosa (3–1) || Van Benschoten (0–1) || — || 46,982 || 10–16
|- style="background:#cfc;" 
| 27 || April 30 || @ Mets || 13–1 || Gorzelanny (2–3) || Pérez (2–2) || — || 46,788 || 11–16
|-

|- style="background:#fcc;"
| 28 || May 1 || @ Nationals || 2–3 || Ayala (1–1) || Grabow (1–1) || Rauch (6) || 24,723 || 11–17
|- style="background:#cfc;" 
| 29 || May 2 || @ Nationals || 11–4 || Marte (2–0) || Lannan (2–3) || — || 26,001 || 12–17
|- style="background:#fcc;"
| 30 || May 3 || @ Nationals || 8–9 || Colomé (1–1) || Maholm (2–3) || Rauch (7) || 34,128 || 12–18
|- style="background:#fcc;"
| 31 || May 4 || @ Nationals || 2–5 || Redding (4–2) || Snell (2–2) || — || 30,564 || 12–19
|- style="background:#cfc;" 
| 32 || May 6 || Giants || 12–6 || Duke (1–2) || Sánchez (2–2) || — || 12,030 || 13–19
|- style="background:#cfc;" 
| 33 || May 7 || Giants || 3–1 || Dumatrait (1–1) || Zito (0–7) || Capps (7) || 9,788 || 14–19
|- style="background:#cfc;" 
| 34 || May 8 || Giants || 5–4 || Osoria (2–1) || Cain (1–3) || Capps (8) || 16,816 || 15–19
|- style="background:#cfc;" 
| 35 || May 9 || Braves || 3–2 || Grabow (2–1) || Bennett (0–2) || — || 21,050 || 16–19
|- style="background:#cfc;" 
| 36 || May 10 || Braves || 5–2 || Gorzelanny (3–3) || James (2–2) || Capps (9) || 28,141 || 17–19
|- style="background:#bbb;"
| — || May 11 || Braves || colspan=6| Postponed rain (Rescheduled for May 12)
|- style="background:#cfc;" 
| 37 || May 12 || Braves || 5–0 || Duke (2–2) || Jurrjens (4–3) || — ||  || 18–19
|- style="background:#fcc;"
| 38 || May 12 || Braves || 1–8 || Hudson (6–2) || Van Benschoten (0–1) || — || 16,669 || 18–20
|- style="background:#cfc;" 
| 39 || May 13 || @ Cardinals || 8–4 (10) || Salas (1–0) || Villone (1–1) || — || 38,800 || 19–20
|- style="background:#fcc;"
| 40 || May 14 || @ Cardinals || 1–5 || Wellemeyer (4–1) || Maholm (2–4) || — || 38,720 || 19–21
|- style="background:#cfc;" 
| 41 || May 15 || @ Cardinals || 11–5 || Grabow (3–1) || Isringhausen (1–5) || — || 41,244 || 20–21
|- style="background:#fcc;"
| 42 || May 16 || @ Cubs || 4–7 || Gallagher (1–0) || Gorzelanny (3–4) || Wood (9) || 40,537 || 20–22
|- style="background:#cfc;" 
| 43 || May 17 || @ Cubs || 7–6 || Marte (3–0) || Mármol (1–1) || Capps (10) || 41,686 || 21–22
|- style="background:#fcc;"
| 44 || May 18 || @ Cubs || 3–4 || Marquis (2–3) || Dumatrait (1–2) || Wood (10) || 41,321 || 21–23
|- style="background:#fcc;"
| 45 || May 20 || Brewers || 2–7 || Parra (2–2) || Maholm (2–5) || — || 11,761 || 21–24
|- style="background:#fcc;"
| 46 || May 21 || Brewers || 1–|4 || Sheets (5–1) || Snell (2–3) || — || 8,805 || 21–25
|- style="background:#cfc;" 
| 47 || May 22 || Brewers || 8–4 || Gorzelanny (4–4) || Bush (1–5) || — || 12,887 || 22–25
|- style="background:#fcc;"
| 48 || May 23 || Cubs || 3–12 || Zambrano (7–1) || Duke (2–3) || — || 32,656 || 22–26
|- style="background:#cfc;" 
| 49 || May 24 || Cubs || 5–4 (14) || Grabow (4–1) || Wuertz (0–1) || — || 29,929 || 23–26
|- style="background:#cfc;" 
| 50 || May 25 || Cubs || 6–5 (11) || Marte (4–0) || Lieber (2–3) || — || 29,415 || 24–26
|- style="background:#fcc;"
| 51 || May 27 || @ Reds || 6–9 || Cueto (3–5) || Snell (2–4) || Cordero (11) || 17,964 || 24–27
|- style="background:#fcc;"
| 52 || May 28 || @ Reds || 1–9 || Arroyo (4–4) || Gorzelanny (4–5) || — || 15,797 || 24–28
|- style="background:#cfc;" 
| 53 || May 29 || @ Reds || 7–2 || Dumatrait (2–2) || Harang (2–7) || — || 18,142 || 25–28
|- style="background:#fcc;"
| 54 || May 30 || @ Cardinals || 4–5 || Wellemeyer (6–1) || Duke (2–4) || Franklin (5) || 42,791 || 25–29
|- style="background:#cfc;" 
| 55 || May 31 || @ Cardinals || 14–4 || Maholm (3–5) || Parisi (0–2) || — || 44,302 || 26–29
|-

|- style="background:#fcc;"
| 56 || June 1 || @ Cardinals || 4–7 || Looper (7–4) || Snell (2–5) || Franklin (6) || 43,462 || 26–30
|- style="background:#cfc;" 
| 57 || June 2 || @ Cardinals || 5–4 || Osoria (3–1) || Osoria (5–3) || Capps (11) || 42,129 || 27–30
|- style="background:#fcc;"
| 58 || June 3 || Astros || 0–2 || Rodríguez (2–1) || Dumatrait (2–3) || Valverde (16) || 13,183 || 27–31
|- style="background:#cfc;" 
| 59 || June 4 || Astros || 5–2 || Duke (3–4) || Oswalt (4–6) || Capps (12) || 9,392 || 28–31
|- style="background:#cfc;" 
| 60 || June 5 || Astros || 4–3 || Maholm (4–5) || Backe (4–7) || Capps (13) || 10,728 || 29–31
|- style="background:#fcc;"
| 61 || June 6 || D-backs || 1–3 || Webb (11–2) || Snell (2–6) || Lyon (13) || 19,437 || 29–32
|- style="background:#fcc;"
| 62 || June 7 || D-backs || 3–4 || Cruz (2–0) || Grabow (4–2) || Lyon (14) || 20,967 || 29–33
|- style="background:#cfc;" 
| 63 || June 8 || D-backs || 6–4 || Dumatrait (3–3) || Davis (2–3) || Capps (14) || 22,222 || 30–33
|- style="background:#cfc;" 
| 64 || June 9 || D-backs || 5–3 || Duke (4–4) || Johnson (4–3) || Capps (15) || 10,717 || 31–33
|- style="background:#fcc;"
| 65 || June 10 || Nationals || 6–7 || Hanrahan (2–2) || Capps (0–1) || Rauch (13) || 12,957 || 31–34
|- style="background:#cfc;" 
| 66 || June 11 || Nationals || 3–1 || Snell (3–6) || Lannan (4–7) || Capps (16) || 15,439 || 32–34
|- style="background:#cfc;" 
| 67 || June 12 || Nationals || 7–5 || Gorzelanny (5–5) || Bergmann (1–4) || Marte (1) || 16,306 || 33–34
|- style="background:#fcc;"
| 68 || June 13 || @ Orioles || 6–9 || Burres (5–5) || Osoria (3–2) || Sherrill (22) || 47,305 || 33–35
|- style="background:#fcc;"
| 69 || June 14 || @ Orioles || 7–8 || Sherrill (2–1) || Capps (0–2) || — || 32,432 || 33–36
|- style="background:#cfc;" 
| 70 || June 15 || @ Orioles || 5–4 || Capps (1–2) || Sherrill (2–2) || — || 31,107 || 34–36
|- style="background:#fcc;"
| 71 || June 17 || @ White Sox || 5–16 || Vázquez (7–5) || Snell (3–7) || — || 28,012 || 34–37
|- style="background:#fcc;"
| 72 || June 18 || @ White Sox || 2–8 || Buehrle (4–6) || Gorzelanny (5–6) || — || 28,570 || 34–38
|- style="background:#fcc;"
| 73 || June 19 || @ White Sox || 8–13 || Floyd (8–3) || Dumatrait (3–4) || — || 26,685 || 34–39
|- style="background:#cfc;" 
| 74 || June 20 || Blue Jays || 1–0 (12) || Yates (3–0) || Carlson (1–1) || — || 28,962 || 35–39
|- style="background:#cfc;" 
| 75 || June 21 || Blue Jays || 6–3 || Maholm (5–5) || Litsch (7–4) || Capps (17) || 27,014 || 36–39
|- style="background:#fcc;"
| 76 || June 22 || Blue Jays || 5–8 || McGowan (6–5) || Beam (0–1) || Ryan (15) || 22,983 || 36–40
|- style="background:#cfc;" 
| 77 || June 24 || Yankees || 12–5 || Gorzelanny (6–6) || Rasner (4–5) ||  || 38,867 || 37–40
|- style="background:#fcc;"
| 78 || June 25 || Yankees || 0–10 || Chamberlain (2–2) || Duke (4–5) || — || 38,954 || 37–41
|- style="background:#bbb;"
|| – || June 26 || Yankees || colspan=6|Postponed (rain) Rescheduled for July 10
|- style="background:#fcc;"
| 79 || June 27 || Rays || 5–10 || Kazmir (7–3) || Barthmaier (0–1) || — || 19,970 || 37–42
|- style="background:#cfc;" 
| 80 || June 28 || Rays || 4–3 (13) || Van Benschoten (1–2) || Hammel (3–3) || — || 17,970 || 38–42
|- style="background:#fcc;"
| 81 || June 29 || Rays || 3–4 || Sonnanstine (9–3) || Yates (3–1) || Percival (19) || 15,828 || 38–43
|- style="background:#fcc;"
| 82 || June 30 || @ Reds || 3–4 || Cordero (3–1) || Capps (1–3) || — || 20,745 || 38–44
|-

|- style="background:#cfc;" 
| 83 || July 1 || @ Reds || 6–5 (11) || Capps (2–3) || Weathers (2–4) || Sánchez (1) || 19,345 || 39–44
|- style="background:#cfc;" 
| 84 || July 2 || @ Reds || 9–5 || Bautista (1–1) || Thompson (0–2) || — || 16,890 || 40–44
|- style="background:#fcc;"
| 85 || July 4 || @ Brewers || 1–9 || Sheets (10–2) || Gorzelanny (6–7) || Villanueva (1) || 41,463 || 40–45
|- style="background:#fcc;"
| 86 || July 5 || @ Brewers || 1–2 || Gagné (2–2) || Yates (3–2) || — || 39,176 || 40–46
|- style="background:#fcc;"
| 87 || July 6 || @ Brewers || 6–11 || Stetter (2–1) || Bautista (1–2) || — || 42,163 || 40–47
|- style="background:#cfc;" 
| 88 || July 7 || Astros || 10–7 || Bautista (2–2) || Hernández (0–3) || Marte (2) || 13,323 || 41–47
|- style="background:#cfc;" 
| 89 || July 8 || Astros || 4–3 || Grabow (5–2) || Brocail (4–4) || Marte (3) || 17,867 || 42–47
|- style="background:#fcc;"
| 90 || July 9 || Astros || 4–6 || Moehler (5–4) || Burnett (0–1) || Valverde (23) || 13,884 || 42–48
|- style="background:#cfc;" 
| 91 || July 10 || Yankees || 4–2 || Maholm (6–1) || Veras (2–1) || Marte (4) || 39,081 || 43–48
|- style="background:#fcc;"
| 92 || July 11 || Cardinals || 0–6 || Lohse (11–2) || Duke (4–6) || — || 37,113 || 43–49
|- style="background:#cfc;" 
| 93 || July 12 || Cardinals || 12–11 (10) || Bautista (3–2) || Perez (2–1) || — || 29,387 || 44–49
|- style="background:#fcc;"
| 94 || July 13 || Cardinals || 6–11 || Springer (2–0) || Osoria (3–3) || — || 21,052 || 44–50
|- style="background:#fcc;"
| 95 || July 17 || @ Rockies || 3–5 || Jiménez (5–9) || Maholm (6–6) || Fuentes (15) || 30,584 || 44–51
|- style="background:#fcc;"
| 96 || July 18 || @ Rockies || 2–5 || Rusch (3–3) || Snell (3–8) || Fuentes (16) || 37,114 || 44–52
|- style="background:#fcc;"
| 97 || July 19 || @ Rockies || 1–7 || de la Rosa (4–5) || Herrera (0–1) || — || 44,565 || 44–53
|- style="background:#fcc;"
| 98 || July 20 || @ Rockies || 3–11 || Cook (12–6) || Duke (4–7) || — || 30,488 || 44–54
|- style="background:#cfc;" 
| 99 || July 21 || @ Astros || 9–3 || Yates (4–2) || Valverde (4–3) || — || 34,624 || 45–54
|- style="background:#cfc;" 
| 100 || July 22 || @ Astros || 8–2 || Maholm (7–6) || Cassel (1–1) || — || 33,996 || 46–54
|- style="background:#cfc;" 
| 101 || July 23 || @ Astros || 8–7 || Osoria (4–3) || Geary (2–2) || Marte (5) || 36,091 || 47–54
|- style="background:#cfc;" 
| 102 || July 24 || Padres || 9–1 || Herrera (1–1) || Hensley (1–1) || — || 17,916 || 48–54
|- style="background:#fcc;"
| 103 || July 25 || Padres || 5–6 || Baek (3–5) || Duke (4–8) || Hoffman (19) || 25,727 || 48–55
|- style="background:#fcc;"
| 104 || July 26 || Padres || 6–9 || Banks (3–4) || Van Benschoten (1–3) || Hoffman (20) || 27,794 || 48–56
|- style="background:#fcc;"
| 105 || July 27 || Padres || 1–3 || Peavy (8–6) || Grabow (5–3) || Hoffman (21) || 21,721 || 48–57
|- style="background:#cfc;" 
| 106 || July 28 || Rockies || 8–4 || Snell (4–8) || Grilli (2–2) || — || 15,303 || 49–57
|- style="background:#cfc;" 
| 107 || July 29 || Rockies || 6–4 || Davis (1–0) || Herges (3–4) || Yates (1) || 17,507 || 50–57
|- style="background:#fcc;"
| 108 || July 30 || Rockies || 4–7 || Cook (14–6) || Duke (4–9) || Fuentes (18) || 16,587 || 50–58
|-

|- style="background:#cfc;" 
| 109 || August 1 || @ Cubs || 3–0 || Karstens (1–0) || Marquis (6–7) || Grabow (1) || 41,340 || 51–58
|- style="background:#fcc;"
| 110 || August 2 || @ Cubs || 1–5 || Lilly (11–6) || Maholm (7–7) ||  || 41,426 || 51–59
|- style="background:#fcc;"
| 111 || August 3 || @ Cubs || 5–8 || Gaudin (8–4) || Hansen (1–4) || Mármol (6) || 41,200 || 51–60
|- style="background:#fcc;"
| 112 || August 4 || @ D-backs || 7–13 || Haren (12–5) || Davis (1–1) || — || 21,826 || 51–61
|- style="background:#fcc;"
| 113 || August 5 || @ D-backs || 1–3 || Webb (16–4) || Duke (4–10) || — || 25,109 || 51–62
|- style="background:#cfc;" 
| 114 || August 6 || @ D-backs || 2–0 || Karstens (2–0) || Johnson (9–8) || — || 28,556 || 52–62
|- style="background:#cfc;" 
| 115 || August 8 || @ Phillies || 2–0 (12) || Beam (1–1) || Walrond (0–1) || Hansen (3) || 43,891 || 53–62
|- style="background:#fcc;"
| 116 || August 9 || @ Phillies || 2–4 || Myers (5–9) || Snell (4–9) || Durbin (1) || 45,060 || 53–63
|- style="background:#fcc;"
| 117 || August 10 || @ Phillies || 3–6 || Eyre (3–0) || Yates (4–3) || Madson (1) || 45,262 || 53–64
|- style="background:#cfc;" 
| 118 || August 11 || @ Mets || 7–5 || Bautista (4–2) || Heilman (2–7) || Grabow (2) || 53,534 || 54–64
|- style="background:#fcc;"
| 119 || August 12 || Reds || 1–5 || Vólquez (14–5) || Karstens (2–1) || — || 23,686 || 54–65
|- style="background:#cfc;" 
| 120 || August 13 || Reds || 5–2 || Maholm (8–7) || Fogg (2–5) || Grabow (3) || 15,787 || 55–65
|- style="background:#fcc;"
| 121 || August 14 || Reds || 1–3 || Cueto (8–11) || Snell (4–10) || Cordero (23) || 35,439 || 55–66
|- style="background:#fcc;"
| 122 || August 15 || Mets || 1–2 || Pelfrey (11–8) || Davis (1–2) || Heilman (3) || 36,418 || 55–67
|- style="background:#fcc;"
| 123 || August 16 || Mets || 4–7 || Martínez (4–3) || Duke (4–11) || Feliciano (2) || 37,506 || 55–68
|- style="background:#fcc;"
| 124 || August 17 || Mets || 0–4 || Santana (11–7) || Karstens (2–2) || — || 36,483 || 55–69
|- style="background:#cfc;" 
| 125 || August 18 || Mets || 5–2 || Burnett (1–1) || Feliciano (2–3) || Grabow (4) || 19,066 || 56–69
|- style="background:#cfc;" 
| 126 || August 19 || @ Cardinals || 4–1 || Snell (5–10) || Looper (11–10) || Beam (1) || 39,502 || 57–69
|- style="background:#fcc;"
| 127 || August 20 || @ Cardinals || 2–11 || Wellemeyer (11–4) || Davis (1–3) || — || 37,269 || 57–70
|- style="background:#fcc;"
| 128 || August 22 || @ Brewers || 4–10 || Bush (8–9) || Duke (4–12) || — || 41,637 || 57–71
|- style="background:#fcc;"
| 129 || August 23 || @ Brewers || 3–6 || Suppan (9–7) || Gorzelanny (6–8) || Torres (25) || 43,293 || 57–72
|- style="background:#fcc;"
| 130 || August 24 || @ Brewers || 3–4 (12) || Mota (4–5) || Davis (1–4) || — || 45,163 || 57–73
|- style="background:#fcc;"
| 131 || August 25 || Cubs || 3–12 || Lilly (13–7) || Karstens (2–3) || — || 14,454 || 57–74
|- style="background:#fcc;"
| 132 || August 26 || Cubs  || 9–14 || Marshall (3–3) || Hansen (1–5) || — || 17,929 || 57–75
|- style="background:#fcc;"
| 133 || August 27 || Cubs || 0–2 || Marquis (9–7) || Duke (4–13) || Wood (27) || 15,260 || 57–76
|- style="background:#fcc;"
| 134 || August 29 || Brewers || 1–3 || Bush (9–9) || Gorzelanny (6–9) || Torres (26) || 18,086 || 57–77
|- style="background:#fcc;"
| 135 || August 30 || Brewers || 3–11 || Suppan (9–7) || Maholm (8–8) || — || 21,931 || 57–78
|- style="background:#fcc;"
| 136 || August 31 || Brewers || 0–7 || Sabathia (15–8) || Karstens (2–4) || — || 21,293 || 57–79
|-

|- style="background:#cfc;" 
| 137 || September 2 || @ Reds || 3–2 || Snell (6–10) || Harang (4–15) || Capps (18) || 18,024 || 58–79
|- style="background:#cfc;" 
| 138 || September 3 || @ Reds || 6–5 || Yates (5–3) || Affeldt (1–1) || Capps (19) || 18,561 || 59–79
|- style="background:#fcc;"
| 139 || September 4 || @ Reds || 6–8 || Masset (1–0) || Hansen (0–3) || Cordero (27) || 20,626 || 59–80
|- style="background:#cfc;" 
| 140 || September 5 || @ Giants || 7–0 || Duke (5–13) || Correia (3–8) || — || 31,133 || 60–80
|- style="background:#fcc;"
| 141 || September 6 || @ Giants || 6–7 || Espineli (2–0) || Bautista (4–2) || Wilson (37) || 38,094 || 60–81
|- style="background:#fcc;"
| 142 || September 7 || @ Giants || 6–11 || Matos (1–2) || Karstens (2–5) || — || 34,122 || 60–82
|- style="background:#fcc;"
| 143 || September 8 || @ Astros || 2–3 || Arias (1–0) || Snell (6–11) || Valverde (41) || 26,526 || 60–83
|- style="background:#fcc;"
| 144 || September 9 || @ Astros || 3–9 || Wolf (10–11) || Ohlendorf (1–2) ||  || 30,034 || 60–84
|- style="background:#fcc;"
| 145 || September 10 || @ Astros || 4–7 || Moehler (11–6) || Bautista (4–4) || Valverde (42) || 26,859 || 60–85
|- style="background:#fcc;"
| 146 || September 11 || @ Astros || 0–6 || Oswalt (15–9) || Zach Duke (5–14) ||  || 31,101 || 60–86
|- style="background:#cfc;" 
| 147 || September 12 || Cardinals || 10–2 || Maholm (9–8) || Piñeiro (6–6) ||  || 14,903 || 61–86
|- style="background:#cfc;" 
| 148 || September 13 || Cardinals || 7–6 (12) || Hansen (2–6) || Perez (3–3) ||  || 17,132 || 62–86
|- style="background:#cfc;" 
| 149 || September 14 || Cardinals || 7–2 || Beam (2–1) || Thompson (5–3) ||  || 18,994 || 63–86
|- style="background:#fcc;"
| 150 || September 15 || Dodgers || 2–8 || Kuroda (9–10) || Ohlendorf (1–3) ||  || 13,147 || 63–87
|- style="background:#fcc;"
| 151 || September 16 || Dodgers || 2–6 || Lowe (14–11) || Karstens (2–6) ||  || 12,741 || 63–88
|- style="background:#cfc;" 
| 152 || September 17 || Dodgers || 15–8 || Grabow (6–3) || Elbert (0–1) ||  || 11,883 || 64–88
|- style="background:#fcc;"
| 153 || September 18 || Dodgers || 3–4 (12) || Proctor (2–0) || Hansen (2–7) || Broxton (14) || 12,709 || 64–89
|- style="background:#fcc;"
| 154 || September 19 || Astros || 1–5 || Wolf (11–12) || Snell (6–12) ||  || 26,301 || 64–90
|- style="background:#cfc;" 
| 155 || September 20 || Astros || 6–4 || Davis (2–4) || Moehler (11–8) || Capps (20) || 36,621 || 65–90
|- style="background:#fcc;"
| 156 || September 21 || Astros || 2–6 || Oswalt (16–10) || Ohlendorf (1–4) ||  || 20,311 || 65–91
|- style="background:#fcc;"
| 157 || September 23 || @ Brewers || 5–7 || Torres (7–5) || Beam (2–2) ||  || 36,612 || 65–92
|- style="background:#fcc;"
| 158 || September 24 || @ Brewers || 2–4 || Sabathia (16–10) || Maholm (9–9) || Torres (28) || 31,164 || 65–93
|- style="background:#fcc;"
| 159 || September 25 || @ Brewers || 1–5 (10) || Stetter (3–1) || Chavez (0–1) ||  || 40,102 || 65–94
|- style="background:#cfc;" 
| 160 || September 26 || @ Padres || 6–3 || Snell (7–12) || Ekstrom (0–2) || Capps (21) || 27,227 || 66–94
|- style="background:#fcc;"
| 161 || September 27 || @ Padres || 2–3 || Young (7–6) || Barthmaier (0–2) || Hoffman (30) || 29,825 || 66–95
|- style="background:#cfc;" 
| 162 || September 28 || @ Padres || 6–1 || Yates (6–3) || LeBlanc (1–3) ||  || 29,191 || 67–95
|-

|-
| Legend:       = Win       = Loss       = PostponementBold = Pirates team member

Record vs. opponents

Detailed records

Roster

Opening Day lineup

Statistics
Hitting
Note: G = Games played; AB = At bats; H = Hits; Avg. = Batting average; HR = Home runs; RBI = Runs batted in

Pitching
Note: G = Games pitched; IP = Innings pitched; W = Wins; L = Losses; ERA = Earned run average; SO = Strikeouts

Awards and honors

Xavier Nady named National League Player of the Week for the opening week of the 2008 regular season.
Ryan Doumit was named the co-National League Player of the Week, along with Ricky Nolasco, for the week of June 9.
Nate McLouth was elected to the 2008 National League all-star team. He batted 1–4, and threw a runner out at home plate from center field in the 11th inning, stopping the game-winning run.
Jason Bay was selected as the winner of the Chuck Tanner Award for "professionalism, cooperation and availability to and with Major League writers best assists them in carrying out daily responsibilities."
Nate McLouth received the Roberto Clemente as "the Pirates player who best exemplifies the standard of excellence achieved by Clemente."

Transactions

Pre-season
(October 29, 2007 – March 24, 2008)

On November 5, 2007, the Pittsburgh Pirates hired John Russell as manager.
On November 7, 2007, the Pittsburgh Pirates promoted Bryan Minniti to director of baseball operations, hired Greg Smith as director of scouting and hired Kyle Stark as director of player development.
On November 9, 2007, the Pittsburgh Pirates named Chuck Tanner as a senior advisor to the baseball operations department.
On November 16, 2007, the Pittsburgh Pirates declined contract option for César Izturis.
On November 20, 2007, the Pittsburgh Pirates hired Tony Beasley as third-base coach, Gary Varsho as bench coach and Luis Dorante as bullpen coach.
On November 21, 2007, the Pittsburgh Pirates hired Jeff Andrews as pitching coach.
On November 27, 2007, the Pittsburgh Pirates hired Don Long as hitting coach.
On November 28, 2007, the Pittsburgh Pirates lost Shane Youman off of waivers to the Philadelphia Phillies.
On December 3, 2007, the Pittsburgh Pirates claimed Josh Wilson from the Tampa Bay Rays and Ty Taubenheim from the Toronto Blue Jays off of waivers.
On December 6, 2007, the Pittsburgh Pirates acquired Evan Meek from the Texas Rangers due to the Rule 5 draft.
On December 7, 2007, the Pittsburgh Pirates traded Salomón Torres to the Milwaukee Brewers in exchange for Marino Salas and Kevin Roberts.
On December 12, 2007, the Pittsburgh Pirates signed free agent Chris Gomez to a 1-year contract.
On December 21, 2007, the Pittsburgh Pirates signed Jorge Velandia, Michel Hernandez, Miguel Perez and Mike Thompson to Minor League contracts.
On January 7, 2008, the Pittsburgh Pirates signed Adam Bernero and Elmer Dessens to Minor League contracts.
On January 11, 2008, the Pittsburgh Pirates signed T. J. Beam, Raul Chavez and José Macías to Minor League contracts.
On January 14, 2008, the Pittsburgh Pirates re-signed Adam LaRoche to a 1-year/$5 million contract.
On January 17, 2008, the Pittsburgh Pirates re-signed José Bautista to a 1-year/$1.8 million contract.
On January 18, 2008, the Pittsburgh Pirates re-signed Xavier Nady to a 1-year/$3.35 million contract and John Grabow to a 1-year/$1.135 million contract.
On January 23, 2008, the Pittsburgh Pirates signed Jaret Wright to a Minor League contract.
On January 24, 2008, the Pittsburgh Pirates signed Hector Carrasco and Casey Fossum to Minor League contracts.
On February 1, 2008, the Pittsburgh Pirates claimed Ray Olmedo off of waivers from the Toronto Blue Jays.
On February 5, 2008, the Pittsburgh Pirates re-signed Freddy Sanchez to a 2-year/$11 million contract.
On February 11, 2008, the Pittsburgh Pirates signed New York Yankees free agent Doug Mientkiewicz to a Minor League contract.
On February 24, 2008, the Pittsburgh Pirates signed free agent Byung-hyun Kim to a 1-year/$850K contract.
On February 26, 2008, the Pittsburgh Pirates lost Ray Olmedo to the Philadelphia Phillies off of waivers.
On March 16, 2008, the Pittsburgh Pirates resigned Ian Snell to a 3-year contract.

In-season
(March 25, 2008 – October 29, 2008)

On March 26, 2008, the Pittsburgh Pirates announced the retirement of Masumi Kuwata, released Byung-hyun Kim, Hector Carrasco and Juan Perez and acquired Tyler Yates from the Atlanta Braves in exchange for Todd Redmond.
On March 31, 2008, the Pittsburgh Pirates signed free agent Jason Davis and Matt Kata to Minor League contracts and released Josh Sharpless.
On April 4, 2008, the Pittsburgh Pirates signed Matt Capps to a 2-year/$3.05 million contract.
On May 1, 2008, the Pittsburgh Pirates released Olivo Astacio.
On May 8, 2008, the Pittsburgh Pirates acquired Jason Michaels from the Cleveland Indians in exchange for a player to be named.
On June 4, 2008, the Pittsburgh Pirates signed Franklyn Germán to a Minor League contract.
On June 25, 2008, the Pittsburgh Pirates acquired Denny Bautista from the Detroit Tigers in exchange for Kyle Pearson and released Kevin Thompson.
On July 10, 2008, the Pittsburgh Pirates traded Craig Wilson to the Seattle Mariners in exchange for a player to be named, acquired Dan Reichert and Ryan Mulhern from the Cleveland Indians in exchange for cash considerations and lost Bryan Bullington to the Cleveland Indians off of waivers.
On July 26, 2008, the Pittsburgh Pirates acquired José Tábata, Ross Ohlendorf, Jeff Karstens and Daniel McCutchen from the New York Yankees in exchange for Xavier Nady and Dámaso Marte.
On July 31, 2008, the Pittsburgh Pirates traded Jason Bay to the Boston Red Sox in exchange for Brandon Moss and Craig Hansen from the Boston Red Sox as well as Andy LaRoche and Bryan Morris from the Los Angeles Dodgers.
On August 21, 2008, the Pittsburgh Pirates traded José Bautista to the Toronto Blue Jays in exchange for a player to be named. (Robinzon Diaz converted on August 25, 2008)
On August 27, 2008, the Pittsburgh Pirates lost free agent Elmer Dessens to the Atlanta Braves.
On September 2, 2008, the Pittsburgh Pirates released Ty Taubenheim.
On September 24, 2008, the Pittsburgh Pirates signed Pedro Alvarez to a Major League contract.

Draft picks

Note
Age at time of draft.

Farm system

LEAGUE CHAMPIONS: VSL Pirates

See also 
 2008 Major League Baseball season

References
Game Logs:
1st Half: Pittsburgh Pirates Game Log on ESPN.com
2nd Half: Pittsburgh Pirates Game Log on ESPN.com
Batting Statistics: Pittsburgh Pirates Batting Stats on ESPN.com
Pitching Statistics: Pittsburgh Pirates Pitching Stats on ESPN.com
2008 Pittsburgh Pirates season at Baseball Reference
2008 Pittsburgh Pirates season at MLB.com

Notes 

Pittsburgh Pirates seasons
Pittsburgh Pirates season
Pitts